Amyntor may refer to:
In Greek mythology:
Amyntor (son of Ormenus), a mythological king, who was the father of Phoenix, the tutor and companion of Achilles.
Amyntor (son of Aegyptus), killed by his wife Damone, one of the Danaïdes.
Amyntor (son of Phrastor), father of Teutamides and grandfather of Nanas.

People:
Amyntor (Macedonian), a 4th-century Macedonian aristocrat and the father of Hephaestion, the general and companion of Alexander the Great
Gerhard von Amyntor, the pen name of the 19th-century German poet Dagobert von Gerhardt

In biology
Ceratomia amyntor, the elm sphinx or four-horned sphinx, a North American moth in the family Sphingidae.
Cyanophrys amyntor, or the Amyntor greenstreak, a butterfly in the family Lycaenidae
Papilio amyntor, a synonym for the butterfly species Artipe eryx

In the arts:
Amyntor, or a Defence of Milton's Life, a 1699 book by the Irish rationalist philosopher John Toland
Amyntor and Theodora a 1747 play by the Scottish dramatist David Mallet
"Amyntor", a 1795 song by the English composer Raynor Taylor
Amyntor, a character in the 1948 historical novel The King Must Die, by Mary Renault, about the ancient Greek hero Theseus.